It's Now or Never is a British gameshow, hosted by Phillip Schofield that aired on ITV, for a period of two episodes.

Episodes
The first episode was broadcast on 22 July 2006, and was notable for featuring a live marriage proposal. The second episode was eventually broadcast on 30 December 2006, which focused on a woman called Louise Holliday, desperate to prove to her closest friend, who has been fighting a serious illness - how much she cares about her.

Cancellation
The series was cancelled after airing only one episode, as a result of poor ratings - 1.7 million saw the programme in its Saturday night prime time slot.

With low ratings, ITV decided to replace the following week's episode, 29 July 2006, with a repeat of outtakes show It'll Be Alright on the Night.

See also 
List of television series canceled after one episode

External links 

BBC article on the shows cancellation
Article on the programme from The Stage

2006 British television series debuts
2006 British television series endings
ITV (TV network) original programming
2000s British game shows
2000s British television miniseries
English-language television shows